Union City is a town in Canadian County, Oklahoma, United States. The population was 1,645 at the 2010 census, a 19.6 percent increase from 1,375 in 2000. It is part of the Oklahoma City metropolitan statistical area.

History
In 1889, a post office opened for the community of Union. A townsite plat was filed during the following year. Union City began in 1890 with the arrival of the Chicago, Kansas and Nebraska Railway (acquired by the Chicago, Rock Island and Pacific Railroad in 1891). The local economy was based on agriculture, and within four years the town had three grain elevators and a farm machinery dealership.

1973 tornado
On May 24, 1973, a tornado rated F4 struck the Union City area and was the first tornado widely documented by science as part of storm chasing field research. NSSL out of Norman, Oklahoma placed numerous storm chasers around it to capture the life cycle on film.

Geography
Union City is located in southern Canadian County at  (35.413582, -97.910634). It is bordered to the east by Oklahoma City, to the north in part by El Reno, and to the south by Grady County, including the town of Minco. The Canadian River forms the county line and the southern boundary of Union City.

Oklahoma State Highway 152 leads east from Union City  to Mustang.

Demographics

As of the 2010 United States Census, there were 1,645 people living in the town.  The population density was 23.3 people per square mile (10/km2). There were 568 housing units at an average density of 12 per square mile (4/km2).  The racial makeup of the town was 91.49% White, 1.75% African American, 2.98% Native American, 0.07% Asian, 0.15% Pacific Islander, 0.65% from other races, and 2.91% from two or more races. Hispanic or Latino of any race were 2.33% of the population.

There were 483 households, out of which 36.9% had children under the age of 18 living with them, 65.0% were married couples living together, 8.1% had a female householder with no husband present, and 21.9% were non-families. 18.0% of all households were made up of individuals, and 6.8% had someone living alone who was 65 years of age or older. The average household size was 2.68 and the average family size was 3.05.

In the town, the population was spread out, with 30.8% under the age of 18, 8.5% from 18 to 24, 26.9% from 25 to 44, 24.9% from 45 to 64, and 8.9% who were 65 years of age or older. The median age was 35 years. For every 100 females, there were 118.6 males. For every 100 females age 18 and over, there were 104.7 males.

The median income for a household in the town was $40,819, and the median income for a family was $47,417. Males had a median income of $33,646 versus $22,039 for females. The per capita income for the town was $17,020. About 7.4% of families and 8.3% of the population were below the poverty line, including 9.1% of those under age 18 and 9.5% of those age 65 or over.

Economy
The city's economy is still supported by goods and services for the local agriculture industry. One grain elevator still operates.

Education
Union City has its own independent school district, Union City, which is composed of an elementary and a high school.

References

External links

Town of Union City official website
History of Union City

Oklahoma City metropolitan area
Towns in Canadian County, Oklahoma
Towns in Oklahoma